The National Stuttering Association (NSA) is a United States support group organization for people who stutter. Its headquarters are in New York City.

The NSA was founded by Bob Goldman and Michael Sugarman as the National Stuttering Project in California in 1977. Currently the NSA functions through a network of more than 100 local adult, teen, and children's chapters nationwide.

The NSA sponsors regional workshops, youth and family events, education seminars for speech-language pathologists, and an Annual Conference, which hosts an average of 900 attendees. The NSA also publishes educational resources, such as pamphlets and booklets about stuttering, as well as a quarterly newsletter: Letting Go.

In November 2002, in the year of the NSA's 25th anniversary, the Association received the Distinguished Service Award from the American Speech-Language-Hearing Association.

The NSA played a key role in establishing the National Stuttering Awareness Week in 1988.

Annual conference
The NSA hosts a conference in the summer every year in the first week of July in cities throughout the United States. These cities included Scottsdale, AZ in 2009, Cleveland, OH in 2010, Fort Worth, TX in 2011, and St. Petersburg, FL in 2012, again in Scottsdale in 2013, and Washington, DC in 2014. In the future conferences will be in Chicago in 2015 and California in 2016. The 2016 conference was a joint conference with the International Stuttering Association.  The conference began with a two-day research symposium with presentations and workshops by experts in the field, which is then followed by a four-day general conference which features workshops led by the experts and by volunteers, as well as a keynote.  The keynote was presented in 2011 by David Seidler, screenwriter of The King's Speech and in 2013 by Trumaine McBride, a cornerback in the National Football League.

Hall of Fame
The NSA Hall of Fame

1996: John Ahlbach, NSA Executive Director 1981–1995
1998: Michael Sugarman
2000: John Paul Larkin (Scatman John) 
2001: Vivian Sheehan 
2002: Eugene Cooper
2003: Lee Reeves NSA Chairman of the Board of Directors 1997–2003
2004: Annie Glenn
2005: Marty Jezer
2007: Annie Bradberry, NSA Executive Director 1993–2003
2009: Judith Kuster
Other inductees include: Fred Murray, Mel Hoffman, Rich Wells, Herb Goldberg, Dorvan Breitenfeldt, John C. Harrison, Russ Hicks, Nina Reeves, and Jim McClure

See also
International Stuttering Association
Stuttering Foundation of America
British Stammering Association
The Indian Stammering Association
Israel Stuttering Association (AMBI)

References

External links
Official website

1977 establishments in California
Mental health organizations in New York (state)
Organizations based in New York City
Organizations established in 1977
Stuttering associations